The Kakkad Hydroelectric Power Plant is located near Seethathode, in the Pathanamthitta district of the Indian state of Kerala. It is operated by the Kerala State Electricity Board.

This hydropower plant has a design capacity of 50 MWe. It has 2 turbines, commissioned in 1998 and 1999.

Features

The project is in the second stage of development. The installed capacity is 50 MW (2 x 25MW). This scheme utilizes the tail race water from Sabarigiri power station and water from the Moozhiyar and Velluthode rivers. Two dams store water for the powerhouse. The main reservoir is on the Moozhiyar. The second reservoir is formed by the Veluthodu dam, across the Velluthode river. After generating power, water is released to the Kakkad River. Ullumkal and Karikkayam power stations use this water for power generation and then release it into the Maniyar reservoir for power generation at the Maniyar power station.

Related projects
Kakkad Power House
Upper Moozhiyar Dam
Upper Moozhiyar Spillway Dam
Veluthoda Forebay (Kakkad) Dam

References

External links

 http://globalenergyobservatory.org/geoid/43256  This article contains quotations from this source, which is available under a Attribution 3.0 United States (CC BY 3.0 US) license.
 http://india-wris.nrsc.gov.in/wrpinfo/index.php?title=Kakkad_Hydroelectric_Project_JH01238
 https://web.archive.org/web/20180419021140/http://india-wris.nrsc.gov.in/wrpinfo/index.php?title=Kakkad_Hep_Power_House_PH01245
 http://www.kseb.in/index.php?option=com_content&view=article&id=70&Itemid=717&lang=en
 https://www.youtube.com/watch?v=15gYl0vntP4

Hydroelectric power stations in India
Pamba River
Buildings and structures in Pathanamthitta district